is a passenger railway station located in the city of Matsuyama, Ehime Prefecture, Japan. It is operated by the private transportation company Iyotetsu.

Lines
During most of the day, trains arrive every fifteen minutes. Trains continue from Matsuyama City Station on the Takahama Line to Takahama Station.

Layout
The station consists of one island platform, wit the station building located at the end of the platform. Passengers must exit the ticket gates before crossing the tracks via a level crossing. The station is attended.

History
Kita-Kume Station was opened on January 1, 1967

Surrounding area
Matsuyama Municipal Kitakume Elementary School
 Higashi Dogo Hot Spring Village

See also
 List of railway stations in Japan

References

External links

 Iyotetsu Station Information

Iyotetsu Yokogawara Line
Railway stations in Ehime Prefecture
Railway stations in Japan opened in 1967
Railway stations in Matsuyama, Ehime